The Afghanistan cricket team toured Ireland in May 2019 to play two One Day International (ODI) matches. Both matches were played at the Stormont Cricket Ground in Belfast. The ODI fixtures were part of Afghanistan's preparation for the 2019 Cricket World Cup. In April 2019, the Afghanistan Cricket Board (ACB) named Gulbadin Naib as the team's new ODI captain, replacing Asghar Afghan. The series was drawn 1–1, with Ireland winning the first match and Afghanistan winning the second.

Squads

ODI series

1st ODI

2nd ODI

References

External links
 Series home at ESPN Cricinfo

2019 in Irish cricket
2019 in Afghan cricket
International cricket competitions in 2019
Afghan cricket tours of Ireland